Mike Cahill (born July 5, 1979) is an American filmmaker.

Early life and education

Mike Cahill was born in New Haven, Connecticut on July 5, 1979. His first forays into filmmaking were with Fisher-Price and VHS camcorders when he was young. He gained his first credit as a documentarian at the age of 17, when he and a friend directed a film titled The Pocket, about D.C go-go music.

After high school, Cahill studied economics at Georgetown University, graduating in 2001. While a student there he formed a close relationship with professional colleague and friend Brit Marling, whom he met at a Georgetown film festival, and the two began working on short films together where Marling would act and Cahill would direct.

Career
While still in his senior year at Georgetown, Cahill began interning with National Geographic Television and Film, soon becoming their youngest field producer, editor and cinematographer. He and Marling collaborated on Boxers and Ballerinas (2004), an exploration of the U.S.–Cuba conflict through the lives of four characters, while living in Cuba. Cahill next moved to Los Angeles. There he was taken on as editor for two Sundance features, Leonard Cohen: I'm Your Man and Everyone Stares: The Police Inside Out.

2011 was Cahill's pivotal year. His first feature film as director, co-written with Marling, Another Earth, about a parallel planet Earth, won the Alfred P. Sloan Prize at the 2011 Sundance Film Festival and was picked up for distribution by Fox Searchlight Pictures. Variety reported: "[It] has been deemed one of the more highly praised pics of the fest as it received a standing ovation after the screening and strong word of mouth from buyers and festgoers."

Cahill's second feature film I Origins again won the Alfred P. Sloan Prize, this time at the 2014 Sundance Film Festival, making Cahill the only person to have received the award twice. The film was picked up for distribution by Fox Searchlight.

In 2011, before the release of I Origins, a press release by Fox Searchlight stated that Cahill was working on a film about reincarnation and another about "a fashion designer who lives at the bottom of the sea." As of 2015 he is also working on a sequel of I Origins. "There's a sequel in the works. It's not scripted. We're not in production yet, but we set up at Fox Searchlight".

Starting in 2015, Cahill is an executive producer of the Syfy TV show The Magicians, and directed the pilot episode. He is also an executive producer on The Path, and directed the first two episodes.

Influences
Cahill has cited Julian Schnabel as a significant influence on his work. He considers Krzysztof Kieslowski one of his favorite filmmakers, specifically citing The Double Life of Véronique as having a profound impact on him. Cahill, who has a casual interest in astronomy, was also influenced by the work of astronomer Richard Berendzen, in particular, Berendzen's audiobook Pulp Physics. He is also an admirer of Carl Sagan and Isaac Asimov.

He has always admired science.

His favorite movie of all time is 2001: A Space Odyssey. "Because that movie, what it presents to you, can’t be articulated in any other form than as a movie," he said.

Filmography

Awards and nominations

References

External links 
 

1979 births
Living people
American cinematographers
American male screenwriters
American film editors
Georgetown College (Georgetown University) alumni
Writers from New Haven, Connecticut
Film directors from Connecticut
Film producers from Connecticut
Screenwriters from Connecticut
Alfred P. Sloan Prize winners